Budimir Lončar (born 1 April 1924) is a Croatian retired diplomat who served as a Minister of Foreign Affairs of SFR Yugoslavia from 1987 until 1991.

He served as Ambassador of the Socialist Federal Republic of Yugoslavia to Indonesia, Germany and the United States. In 1984, he was appointed Deputy Minister of Foreign Affairs of SFRY, and in 1987 Minister of Foreign Affairs. He held this post until the disintegration of Yugoslavia in 1991. During the World War II Lončar joined Yugoslav Partisans anti-Axis resistance movement.

From 1993 to 1995 he served as the Special Representative of the UN Secretary-General to the Non-Aligned Movement. He was advisor in various NGOs, like Appeal of Conscience Foundation, The World Council of Religious and Spiritual Leaders in New York City, and the Center for Humanitarian Dialogue in Geneva. He later served as an advisor to Croatian presidents Stjepan Mesić and Ivo Josipović.

Family, youth and education
Lončar ancestors originally moved to the island of Ugljan from the Lika region. Budimir's father Ive and mother Ivana, both born in 1884, were both from the island of Ugljan. They had 10 children, 5 of which survived their early childhood, one of which was the youngest Budimir. Alongside Budimir, the other four were his oldest sister Anastazija (born in 1906), and his brothers Šime, Stanko, and Ante (Tonći). Budimir's father was a ship owner and he traded with the mainland city of Zadar which at the time was under the Italian control. The city of Zadar with its elegant buildings, gelato shops, and Perugina candies left a strong impression on young Budimir who described it as his first urban experience. His mother Ivana was a devout Roman Catholic and two of his uncles were Roman Catholic priests. Under the influence of his father Budimir moved to Zagreb to complete gymnasium high school. His class master and physics professor was  who influenced him to join Yugoslav Partisans.

World War II in Yugoslavia
During the World War II in Yugoslavia the country was divided and Budimir's region was incorporated into the Governorate of Dalmatia of the Kingdom of Italy. Budimir Lončar joined Yugoslav Partisans in June of 1942 where he was active as a member of the League of Communist Youth of Yugoslavia. Under the mentorship of Jure Kaštelan Budimir Lončar edited Omladinska iskra magazine. He was wounded on two occasions, first in 1943 on the island of Ugljan  and in 1944 on Dugi Otok.

Early career
In May of 1950 Budimir Lončar was invited to become consul and adviser at the Mission of Yugoslavia to the United Nations where he remained until 1956. After the posting at the New York mission he returned to Belgrade to the position of the Chief of Analytics and Political Planning at the Federal Ministry of Foreign Affairs where he remained until 1964.

See also
 Yugoslavia and the Non-Aligned Movement
 Indonesia–Yugoslavia relations
 Germany–Yugoslavia relations
 United States–Yugoslavia relations

References

Sources
 

1924 births
Living people
Ambassadors of Yugoslavia to Germany
Ambassadors of Yugoslavia to Indonesia
Ambassadors of Yugoslavia to the United States
Government ministers of Yugoslavia